Verónica Dahl is an Argentine/Canadian computer scientist, who is recognized as one of the 15 founders of the field of logic programming.

Early life
Dahl attended college at Buenos Aires University, and graduated from there with a degree in computer science in 1974. As the political conflict in Argentina increased, Dahl attended graduate school in  France. In 1977, she was the first graduate at the Université d'Aix-Marseille to receive a doctorate in Artificial Intelligence.

Career
While involved in the research for her doctorate, Dahl became a pioneer in the field of logic programming, developing both the first logic programming database system, and an (also logic-programmed) front end to consult it in a human language (Spanish). Dahl's research and methodologies became multi-disciplinary including Computational Linguistics, Computational Molecular Biology, and Artificial Intelligence. She became an associate professor at Simon Fraser University in 1982, and became a full professor there in 1991. In 1996 she was honoured by the Logic Programming Association as one of the 15 founders of the Logic Programming Field, and has extensively pioneered as well the areas of Logic Grammars and Constraint Handling Rules.

Dahl is a woman pioneer in a male-dominated field. She fought gender inequality while she was a professor at Simon Fraser University, both through mentoring and role modelling, and through concrete actions. After Simon Fraser University refused to reimburse her $17 for childcare expenses while she was delivering a guest speech in Victoria, where she’d traveled with her nursing baby, she went first to her department and then Natural Sciences and Engineering Research Council of Canada (NSERC) with her protest, which ended with the NSERC changing their policy to make childcare a covered expense for nursing researchers they funded. She proposed and actively promoted the provision of childcare at logic programming conferences, until it was adopted formally into their constitution, and is now routinely offered as a result. She also obtained a change in SFU's legislation when it resulted in her graduate student being timed out for delays caused by life-threatening medical conditions upon birthing twins.

She has developed numerous international research projects and collaborations, most notably with Denmark, Spain, Portugal, Germany and France, and worked with IBM, Vancouver Software Labs, International Artificial Intelligence. In her work with IBM, she obtained a record-breaking research contract. She served as president of the Association of Logic Programming from 2001-2005. She was awarded the prestigious Marie Curie Chair of Excellence 2008-2011 from the European Commission for her pioneering work on Constraint Solving and Language Processing for Bioinformatics. In 2012 she quit her Full Professor position at Simon Fraser University in order to focus on research. SFU awarded her Lifetime Professor Emerits status as from 2013.  Her research program continues under NSERC funding, as well as through her own AI company, Regenerative AI, and she serves at the Scientific Advisory Board of IMDEA Software. She balances her scientific activities with artistic ones, as a student of music, theatre and dance, and performs regularly as singer and guitarist in Vancouver.

Research
Dahl's research is focused on "bridging the gap between the formal and the humanistic sciences, and to achieve more human-like communication with computers". As such it is multi-faceted, but always pivoting around the main incarnations of inferential programming that she helped pioneer: Logic programming, Constraint- based Programming, and Logic Grammars. She also incorporated non-classical reasoning capabilities into Prolog, Hyprolog and CHRG.  Dahl's research has had theoretical and practical impact in logic, linguistics, computational intelligence, internet programming, virtual worlds and molecular biology.

Her work on discovering signature oligos, which resulted in software being used daily at Agriculture and Agri-Food Canada, has also been used to complete the validation of an array for all Phytophthora species, with high impact for forestry (as one of the species is the causal agent of the sudden oak death which is devastating California), for marine sciences (it has been used to monitor biodiversity in Hawaïian coral reefs), for entomology (for characterizing biting flies) and for detecting fraudulent fish sales. Her present research focuses on grammar induction for under-resourced languages and on solidarity vs. domination-promoting uses of AI.

Most Significant Scholarly Publications
 Language-proficient Knowledge Bases and the World Wide Web
 Intelligent methodologies for Life Sciences, in particular Molecular Biology
 Properties as constraints—from parsing to cognitive modeling
 Integrating high level methodologies into a new language: HYPROLOG

Honors and awards
Dahl has received many honors and awards in her career. In 1994, Dahl received the Calouste Gulbenkian Award for Science and Technology. In 1997, she was named as one of the founding members in logic programming by the Association for Logic Programming. In 2009, she received the Best Promising Paper Award at the Third International Work-Conference on the Interplay between Natural and Artificial Computation (2009).

Books
(1989) Abramson, H. & Dahl, V. Logic Grammars. Springer.

Literary works

Prose
(1999) Love to Hide, Love to Invent. First Prize in the Prose Category, Cecilia Lamont Literary Contest.
(2000) Detour. First Prize, Crime55 literary contest.
(2000) A Case of Possession. First Prize in the Prose Category, Cecilia Lamont Literary Contest.

Poetry
(2000) Wholeness. Finalist of the 11th Annual Poetry contest, Hope Writers Guild.
(2000) Life Tides. Finalist of the Millenium 2000 Poetry contest.

See also
 Logic programming
 Timeline of women in science

References

Living people
Argentine emigrants to Canada
Argentine computer scientists
Canadian computer scientists
Argentine women scientists
Academic staff of Simon Fraser University
Logic programming researchers
Women logicians
Canadian women computer scientists
20th-century Canadian women scientists
21st-century Canadian women scientists
Year of birth missing (living people)